AMERICAS-II is a fiber optic submarine communications cable that carries telecommunications between Florida, the U.S. Virgin Islands, Puerto Rico, Martinique, Curaçao, Trinidad and Tobago, Venezuela, French Guiana, Suriname and Guyana (both through Cayenne), and Brazil. It has been in service since August 2000 and is operated on a common carrier basis.

AMERICAS-II consists of three interconnected rings (North, South, and West Systems), each operating at 2.5 gigabits per second ( Gbit/s), initially in separate collapsed ring configurations, and a dedicated link between Curaçao and Venezuela not operating in a collapsed ring configuration. Each fiber pair in each of the three systems will have a capacity of thirty-two 155 megabits per second ( Mbit/s) OC-3 Basic System Modules (BSM), with each BSM containing 63 Minimum Investment Units (MIUs) and equipped at the outset for a capacity of 1008 MIUs. Its initial total rate of 40 Gbit/s increased in 2009 to 160 Gbit/s and again 2010 to an unknown rate.

Landing points

Fortaleza, Brazil
Cayenne, French Guiana
Chaguaramas, Trinidad and Tobago
Camuri, Venezuela
Willemstad, Curaçao
Le Lamentin, Martinique
Saint Croix, U.S. Virgin Islands
Miramar, San Juan, Puerto Rico
Hollywood, Florida, United States

See also
List of international submarine communications cables

References

External links
 
 AMERICAS-II Cable Landing License as adopted by the Federal Communications Commission.
 Tyco International Ltd. - Lead Supplier in US$310 Million Americas II Supply Contract press release from Tyco International April 1998
 Embratel Inaugurates Americas II Cable October 2000

Liberty Latin America
Submarine communications cables in the Caribbean Sea
Submarine communications cables in the South Atlantic Ocean
2000 establishments in North America
2000 establishments in South America